Dead Rising: Endgame is a 2016 American action horror zombie film directed by Pat Williams and written by Tim Carter and Michael Ferris. The film stars Jesse Metcalfe, Keegan Connor Tracy, Dennis Haysbert, Marie Avgeropoulos, Jessica Harmon, Camille Sullivan and Victor Webster. It is a sequel to the 2015 film Dead Rising: Watchtower. It was released on Crackle on June 20, 2016.

Plot
Set between the events of Dead Rising 2 and 3, the story continues where Watchtower left off. Chase catches Lyons' crimes on camera; however, his boss refused to broadcast it due to fear the military will come and kill them. Lyons sends his agents to kill Chase; however, Chase escaped.  Garth is a skilled zombie killer and video game aficionado who talks a big and crude game to mask his gentle side. Rand is a handsome, cruel scientist who was hired by the government to find a cure for the raging zombie infection but instead is conducting horrendous experiments on the infected making the zombies faster and stronger. Sandra Lowe is a skilled computer hacker and Chase’s on-and-off girlfriend who joins him in his quest to battle the zombie-infested underground and stop General Lyons’ plan. George Hancock is the courageous whistleblower who compels Chase and his team to enter a zombie-infested city on a rescue mission. Jill is a news producer who joins Chase and his intrepid crew to infiltrate a secret laboratory and stop the carnage. Susan Ingot is the CEO of Phenotrans, the manufacturer of Zombrex, the vaccine that keeps the zombie infection at bay. It's reveal that Lyons and Phenotrans were behind the last outbreak at East Mission. Susan fears the military is planning to kill all the infected people and secretly plans unleashed a new zombie virus to stay in business. Phenotrans employees are against Ingot's plot and goes the reporter to disclosed reveal this information and gives her the evidence. Chase and the others discover that Jordan is alive.  Garth gets bitten by a fast zombie. George Hancock steals a new Zombie drug from Dr. Rand.

Chase and his allies were able to stop the military's plan causing General Lyons to flee. George Hancock was underground to escape; however, was shot by Lyons's agents. The new drug that George stole is now lost underground.

Cast
 Jesse Metcalfe as Chase Carter
 Keegan Connor Tracy as Jordan Blair
 Dennis Haysbert as General Lyons
 Marie Avgeropoulos as Sandra Lowe
 Jessica Harmon as Jill Eikland
 Camille Sullivan as Susan Ingot
 Victor Webster as Chuck Greene
 Patrick Sabongui as Garth
 Billy Zane as Leo Rand
 Ian Tracey as George Hancock

Production
A sequel to Dead Rising: Watchtower, Dead Rising: Endgame, was announced for Spring 2016 on Crackle with Jesse Metcalfe, Keegan Connor Tracy, and Dennis Haysbert reprising their roles from the first film and Sabongui returning in a new role. New to the cast are Billy Zane as Rand, Marie Avgeropoulos as Sandra Lowe, Ian Tracey as George Hancock, Jessica Harmon as Jill, Victor Webster as Dead Rising 2 hero Chuck Greene and Camille Sullivan as Susan Ingot.

Reception
IGN awarded it a score of 6.7 out of 10, saying "Endgame strays further from its source material than the previous film, but it's also superior in terms of quality."

Accolades

References

External links
 
 
 
 

2016 films
2016 horror films
2016 action thriller films
American action thriller films
American horror thriller films
American sequel films
Dead Rising
Live-action films based on video games
Films shot in Vancouver
Legendary Pictures films
Films based on Capcom video games
American zombie films
2010s English-language films
2010s American films